Varhaug Church is a parish church of the Church of Norway in Hå Municipality in Rogaland county, Norway. It is located just south of the village of Varhaug on the Odland farm. It is the church for the Varhaug parish which is part of the Jæren prosti (deanery) in the Diocese of Stavanger. The white, wooden church was built in a long church style in 1904 using designs by the architect Hartvig Sverdrup Eckhoff. The church seats about 465 people.

History

The earliest existing historical records of the church date back to the year 1328, but it was not new that year. In 1627, the old stave church was torn down and replaced with a new building on the same site.

In 1828, the church was torn down again and rebuilt, reusing many of the same materials from the old building. The new building was consecrated on 7 December 1904 and then the old church was torn down the following spring in 1905.

See also
List of churches in Rogaland

References

Hå
Churches in Rogaland
Wooden churches in Norway
20th-century Church of Norway church buildings
Churches completed in 1904
13th-century establishments in Norway